Janelle Cuthbertson (born 3 September 1990) is an Australian rules footballer for Port Adelaide in the AFL Women's (AFLW). She has previously played for Fremantle.

AFLW career
Cuthbertson was drafted by Fremantle ahead of the 2020 AFL Women's season

Cuthbertson had a breakout season in 2021, being named in the 2021 AFL Women's All-Australian team on the half-back flank after a strong season as an intercepting defender.

Cuthbertson attended Texas A&M University between 2009 and 2013 and was on their tennis team.

In the 2021 AFL Women's season, Cuthbertson was awarded with her maiden All-Australian blazer, named on the half back position. It was announced she re-signed with the Dockers for two more seasons on 5 June 2021.

In March 2023, Cuthbertson joined Port Adelaide as part of the 2023 AFL Women's season period of priority signings.

Statistics
Statistics are correct to the end of the 2021 season.

|- 
| scope="row" text-align:center | 2020
| 
| 29 || 5 || 0 || 0 || 18 || 9 || 27 || 6 || 11 || 0.0 || 0.0 || 3.6 || 1.8 || 5.4 || 1.2 || 2.2 || 0
|- style="background:#EAEAEA"
| scope="row" text-align:center | 2021
| 
| 29 || 10 || 0 || 0 || 75 || 13 || 88 || 27 || 12 || 0.0 || 0.0 || 7.5 || 1.3 || 8.8 || 2.7 || 1.2 || 0
|- class="sortbottom"
! colspan=3 | Career
! 15
! 0
! 0
! 93
! 22
! 115
! 33
! 23
! 0.0
! 0.0
! 6.2
! 1.5
! 7.7
! 2.2
! 1.5
! 0
|}

References

External links 

1990 births
Living people
Fremantle Football Club (AFLW) players
Australian rules footballers from Western Australia
Texas A&M Aggies women's tennis players